Kef Lahmar (Arabic: كاف الاحمر, lit. red foothill) is a municipality in El Bayadh Province, Algeria. It is part of the district of Rogassa and has a population of 5.245, which gives it 7 seats in the PMA. Its municipal code is 3212. There is a hot spring there.

Communes of El Bayadh Province